Houston Adventist Academy, previously known as The Oaks Adventist Christian School, is a private Christian school located in Cypress, an area in unincorporated Harris County, Texas, with PreKindergarten (4 year old) through twelfth grade. It is a part of the Seventh-day Adventist education system, the world's second largest Christian school system.

History
The Oaks Adventist Christian School opened in the fall of 2003.

It was previously in another unincorporated area of Harris County, near Houston.

The school opened its current campus in August 2011.

Plans were in the works to open a daycare facility on the campus in the summer of 2014.

Accreditation
Both the elementary and high school programs are fully accredited with the North American Division of Seventh-day Adventist, The National Council for Private Schools, The Texas Private School Accreditation Commission and the Texas Education Agency.

Curriculum
All students are required to take classes in the core areas of English, Basic Sciences, Mathematics, a Foreign Language, and Social Sciences.

Religion
All students take religion classes each year that they are enrolled. These classes cover topics in biblical history and Christian and denominational doctrines. Weekly, the entire student body gathers together in the auditorium for an hour-long chapel service.

Athletics
The Academy offers the following sports:
Basketball (boys & girls)
Volleyball (boys & girls)
Soccer (co-ed)

See also

 List of Seventh-day Adventist secondary schools
 Seventh-day Adventist education

References

Christianity in Houston
Christian schools in Texas
Educational institutions established in 2003
Private K-12 schools in Harris County, Texas
Adventist secondary schools in the United States
2003 establishments in Texas